The Roter Berg in the Ore Mountains is a mountain in the German free state of Saxony in southeastern Germany.

Mountains of Saxony
Mining in the Ore Mountains
Schwarzenberg, Saxony